Michael Colton (born 1975) is an American screenwriter and former journalist. With writing partner John Aboud, he was a regular commentator on Best Week Ever and other VH1 shows, including I Love the '80s.

Personal life 
Colton attended Newton North High School in Massachusetts, where he wrote a humor column for the student newspaper. He graduated from Harvard University, where he was an editor at both the Harvard Lampoon and The Harvard Crimson.

He married lawyer and Harvard alum Carla Pereira on May 30, 2004.

Career 
Colton has co-written the films A Futile and Stupid Gesture, Penguins of Madagascar and The Comebacks. He has also co-produced the television series Close Enough and Zoolander: Super Model and written for Childrens Hospital and Leverage.

In the late 1990s, Colton was a journalist at The Washington Post. He has also written for The New York Times Magazine, the Los Angeles Times, The Boston Globe, Newsweek, The New York Observer, the Washington City Paper, Brill's Content, and McSweeney's.

During the Writers Guild of America strike of 2007–2008, Colton and Aboud created the website AMPTP.com, a parody of the Alliance of Motion Picture and Television Producers' official website, AMPTP.org.

From 2000 to 2003, Colton and Aboud ran Modern Humorist, an entertainment company based in Brooklyn, best known for its online magazine.

In 2021, he co-created, co-wrote the television series Home Economics with John Aboud, it premiered on ABC on April 7, 2021.

Filmography

Television

Movies

References

External links
 Colton & Aboud homepage
 A Moveable Feast: With Absolutely No Cash, A Reporter Gets Fed For A Week
 Michael Colton in the New York Times Magazine (Jan. 21, 2007)
 

20th-century American journalists
American male journalists
20th-century American male writers
21st-century American journalists
21st-century American male writers
21st-century American screenwriters
American male screenwriters
Jeopardy! contestants
Journalists from Massachusetts
Living people
People from Newton, Massachusetts
Screenwriters from Massachusetts
The Harvard Crimson people
The Harvard Lampoon alumni
The Washington Post people
1975 births